Aechmea pedicellata is a plant species in the genus Aechmea. This species is endemic to the State of Espírito Santo in eastern Brazil.

Cultivars
 Aechmea 'Nelwyn'

References

pedicellata
Flora of Brazil
Plants described in 1988